The men's 400 metre freestyle was a swimming event held as part of the swimming at the 1920 Summer Olympics programme. It was the third appearance of the event.

A total of 22 swimmers from 11 nations competed in the event, which was held from Thursday, August 26 to Saturday, August 28, 1920.

Records

These were the standing world and Olympic records (in minutes) prior to the 1920 Summer Olympics.

Results

Quarterfinals

The fastest two in each heat and the fastest third-placed from across the heats advanced.

Heat 1

Heat 2

Heat 3

Heat 4

Heat 5

Semifinals

The fastest two in each semi-final and the faster of the two third-placed swimmer advanced to the final.

Semifinal 1

Semifinal 2

Final

References

Notes
 
 
 sports-reference

Swimming at the 1920 Summer Olympics
Men's events at the 1920 Summer Olympics